Duas Vozes is an album by Brazilian composer, guitarist and pianist Egberto Gismonti and percussionist Naná Vasconcelos recorded in 1984 and released in 1985 on the ECM label. The album follows the duo's 1977 collaboration Dança Das Cabeças.

Reception
The Allmusic review by Alvaro Neder awarded the album 4½ stars stating "Egberto is very fond of percussive attacks and ethereal configurations, both acquiring superior importance in his music, not being necessarily attached to or supportive for a musical theme or melody".

Track listing
All compositions by Egberto Gismonti except as indicated
 "Aquarela do Brasil" (Ary Barroso) - 6:01 
 "Rio de Janeiro" - 6:27 
 "Tomarapeba" (Traditional) - 3:42 
 "Dancando" - 7:55 
 "Fogueira" - 5:52 
 "Bianca" - 6:41 
 "Don Quixote" (G. E. Carneiro, Gismonti) - 7:41 
 "O Dia, À Noite" (Naná Vasconcelos) - 3:52 
Recorded at Rainbow Studio in Oslo, Norway in June 1984

Personnel
 Egberto Gismonti - guitar, piano, dilruba, wood flutes, voice
 Naná Vasconcelos - percussion, berimbau, voice

References

1985 albums
ECM Records albums
Albums produced by Manfred Eicher
Egberto Gismonti albums
Naná Vasconcelos albums